Pidakkozhi Koovunna Noottandu is a 1994 Indian Malayalam-language comedy-drama film directed by Viji Thampi and written by Sasidharan Arattuvazhi from a story by Urvashi, who also produced the film. Starring Urvashi, Manoj K. Jayan, Jagathy Sreekumar, Kalpana, K. P. A. C. Lalitha, Vinaya Prasad, Janardhanan, Ratheesh and Sai Kumar. The story revolves around paying guests in a female-only homestay who identify themselves as misandrists.

The film was a commercial success at the box office. It was remade in Telugu as Adalla Majaka in the next year.

Plot

The story revolves around a paying guest home run by Chinthamani Ammal who is a determined misandrist due to a failed love affair. Only misandrists are allowed as paying guests. Ponnamma, one of the paying guests, hates men because of her parents being partial to her twin brother Ponnappan. Another guest, Nancy, is a lawyer and is engaged on a post divorce custody battle for the child with her ex-husband Tony Varghese. Vasundhara and Bhagyarekha, the other two guests, pretend to be misandrists to please Chinthamani Ammal. One day a man enters their house resulting in him being assaulted by Chintamani Ammal. A while later, when he wakes up, to everybody’s horror, they find out that the man became mentally retarded. The other lodgers blame Chinthamani Ammal as she was the assaulter. The lodgers as well as Chintamani Ammal try to bring back his memory but in vain. At last they decide to bring back Chinthamani Ammal’s long lost lover to cure him, who called himself as Ikru and behaves in a childish manner. Finally Ikru, whose real name is Sathyaseelan, is cured and Chinthamani and her lover reunite. In between Bhagyarekha falls  in love with Sachidanandan, a local man. When goons try to attack her, Sachi comes there and saves her ending up in police station but is freed in the end. Then Bhagyarekha’s flashback is revealed. She used to work in a hotel with her sister. When her sister was about to be assaulted she tried to fight back resulting in a goon’s assistance’s death. From then on she was hiding from the goons. Many other sequences occur which shows how Sachi and Bhagya try to escape from the goons which forms the rest of the movie. In the end everybody finds their own love and happiness.

Cast

Soundtrack

References

External links
 

1994 films
1990s Malayalam-language films
Indian comedy-drama films
Films directed by Viji Thampi
Malayalam films remade in other languages